Thrypticus is a genus of long-legged flies in the family Dolichopodidae. There are about 90 described species in Thrypticus. All known larvae of the genus are phytophagous stem-miners of plants in the families Cyperaceae, Poaceae, Juncaceae, and Pontederiaceae. Female adults have a strong, pointed ovipositor used to pierce and insert eggs in the stems of the plants.

See also
 List of Thrypticus species

References

Medeterinae
Dolichopodidae genera
Diptera of Australasia
Taxa named by Carl Eduard Adolph Gerstaecker